James Guerin (20 October 1894 – December 1918) was an Irish hurler. His championship career with the Clare senior team lasted from 1914 until 1918.

Born in Ballycar, County Clare, Guerin first played competitive hurling in his youth. By the age of eighteen he had joined the Newmarket-on-Fergus senior team and won his first county senior championship medal in 1912, before winning a second medal in 1916. Guerin later joined the newly-formed Ballycar club.

Guerin first played competitive inter-county hurling at the age of twenty when he was selected for the Clare senior team. After playing no part in the provincial championship, he made his debut in the 1915 All-Ireland final. Clare defeated Laois on that occasion and Guerin won his only All-Ireland medal. He played his last game for Clare in September 1918.

Guerin died on 16 December 1918 as a result of the 1918 flu pandemic.

Honours

Newmarket-on-Fergus
Clare Senior Hurling Championship (2): 1912, 1916

Clare
All-Ireland Senior Hurling Championship (1): 1914

References

1894 births
1918 deaths
Newmarket-on-Fergus hurlers
Clare inter-county hurlers
All-Ireland Senior Hurling Championship winners
Deaths from Spanish flu